Vetri Palanisamy is an Indian cinematographer who primarily works in Tamil and Telugu film industries. He is an alumnus of Film and Television Institute of Tamil Nadu, Chennai. He is known for his work in films such as Souryam, Muni 2: Kanchana, Veeram, Vedalam, Viswasam and Annaatthe.

Early life and career
After completing the Diploma in film Technology in Cinematography Vetri started assisting with Cinematographer S. Saravanan in the films like Aahaa..!, Auto Driver, Sangamam, Oruvan, Vallarasu, Maayi.
Vetri made his debut as a cinematographer in the film Agaram and then he got a break with the action drama film Thenavattu (2008), before working on the comedy Maasilamani (2009) and the successful horror film, Muni 2: Kanchana (2011) with Raghava Lawrence. Vetri has often collaborated with director Siva and has been a part of his Telugu films, Souryam (2008), Sankham (2009), and Daruvu (2012), as well as his Tamil films with Ajith Kumar: Veeram (2014), Vedalam (2015), Vivegam (2017), and Viswasam (2019). The pair had earlier studied together at Adyar Film Institute.

Filmography

References

External links
 

Living people
Artists from Chennai
People from Coimbatore district
Telugu film cinematographers
Tamil film cinematographers
Cinematographers from Tamil Nadu
M.G.R. Government Film and Television Training Institute alumni
Year of birth missing (living people)